The 1985 Big Eight men's basketball tournament was held March 5–7 at a combination of on-campus gymnasiums and Kemper Arena in Kansas City, Missouri.

Top-seeded Oklahoma defeated #3 seed Iowa State in the championship game, 73–71, to win the Big Eight men's basketball tournament.

The Sooners received an automatic bid to the 1985 NCAA tournament. They were joined in the tournament by fellow Big Eight members Iowa State and Kansas, who earned at-large bids.

Format
All eight of the conference's members participated in the tournament field. They were seeded based on regular season conference records, with all teams placed and paired in the initial quarterfinal round.

All first-round games were played on the home court of the higher-seeded team. The semifinals and championship game were played at Kemper Arena in Kansas City, Missouri.

Bracket

References

Tournament
Big Eight Conference men's basketball tournament
Big Eight Conference men's basketball tournament
Big Eight Conference men's basketball tournament